The Howell Living History Farm, also known as the Joseph Phillips Farm, is a  living open-air museum located north of Titusville in the Pleasant Valley section of Hopewell Township in Mercer County, New Jersey. The farm was added to the National Register of Historic Places on May 2, 1977, for its significance in agriculture and architecture. The farm was included in the Pleasant Valley Historic District on June 14, 1991.

History and description
The farm was first created by Joseph Phillips, a blacksmith, who purchased  from William Bryant in 1732. Henry served as a captain in the Hunterdon County Regiment of the Continental Army during the American Revolution. An inventory of the farm on his death in 1805 listed two teams of oxen, two slaves, a Rockingham colt, and the flax in the ground. The current buildings on the property date to the 19th century, primarily before the American Civil War. The final private owner of the farm was the Howell family, who donated the land to Mercer County in 1974 for use as a museum. 

The museum shows farm life from the year 1900.  The farm is owned by Mercer County and operated by the Mercer County Park Commission with the support and assistance of The Friends of Howell Living History Farm.

See also
National Register of Historic Places listings in Mercer County, New Jersey
Allaire Village, a similar living history museum located in Howell / Wall townships

References

External links

Living museums in New Jersey
Museums in Mercer County, New Jersey
Farm museums in New Jersey
Hopewell Township, Mercer County, New Jersey
Historic districts on the National Register of Historic Places in New Jersey
National Register of Historic Places in Mercer County, New Jersey
1732 establishments in New Jersey
New Jersey Register of Historic Places
Open-air museums in New Jersey
Individually listed contributing properties to historic districts on the National Register in New Jersey